William McClaughry was one of three ex-slaves who achieved the impossible dream of becoming upstate land barons during the post-Revolutionary War period, when most Blacks were still in shackles.

Most former slaves were doomed to a life of abject poverty. Land ownership in those days, even in New York, was a privilege enjoyed only by a few wealthy whites.

But according to three historians who researched the topic, ex-slaves, William, Thomas and John McClaughry achieved their own impossible dream. In a series of shrewd transactions, they not only acquired large real estate holdings - almost 500 acres of fertile farmland in Walkill and Orange County - but also won the respect and admiration of their White neighbors.

The McClaughrys called their land "Guinea" which in their native language means "Africa".

Black historian D. Kevin Barrett Bilali of nearby Newburgh, N.Y., who conducted a year long research of Orange County archives for information about the McClaughry family notes however that the three Black McClaughrys had some unexpected help.

It came from their conscience stricken slave owner, James McClaughry, a popular resident and an officer in George Washington's Continental Army.   Bilali says James McClaughry granted them their freedom.  A team of early 1900 historical writers in Orange County, Ruttenver and Clark, reached the same conclusion.1

Probably none of it would have occurred if Col. McClaughry himself had not been wounded and captured during a battle in 1777 with British and Hessian forces near Fort Montgomery in Orange County. He spent the rest of the war in a British prison in New York City. Prison life changed McClaughry's attitude about slavery, according to Ruttenber and Clark.

Most of the prisoners were soon exchanged or paroled, but McClaughry wasn't and suffered quite sufficiently to deepen and broaden his hatred for the English, they wrote. In other words, the British treated McClaughry as if he was a slave.

As a result of his maltreatment, he freed all his Negro slaves except two females, the Ruttenber and Clark report continues. The two females were retained for his wife.  In addition to freedom, Col. McClaughry gave them (the former slaves) oxen, farming implements, etc. and from 180 to 200 pounds each. Two of the male slaves bore the name Thomas and William McClaughry....Apparently the name was kept by several "Colored" families in the district. They were considered the better class, generally thrifty and well to do.

The ex-slaves apparently used the money to purchase the land.

Bilali's research revealed that McClaughry was married twice.  His first wife was Catherine Clinton, daughter of Charles Clinton and sister of George Clinton, New York State's first governor. She died in 1762. McClaughry married Agnes Humphrey a year later. He had no children.

None of the records uncovered tell whether or not the three Black McClaughrys were related. They could have been brothers, cousins or not related at all.  But they apparently took the name of their plantation owner and put the gifts they received from him to good use.

Research has uncovered an entirely different story, Bilali wrote in a press release about his findings. There was more to the brief story written by the White historians of the time.

Bilali's research, which for him quickly became more a passion for the real story than a mere history project, took him to many libraries and county archives.

References

18th-century American slaves
People from Orange County, New York
Farmers from New York (state)
African-American history of New York (state)